The Best American Short Stories 2015, a volume in the Best American Short Stories series, was edited by Heidi Pitlor and by guest editor T. C. Boyle.

Short Stories included

References

Fiction anthologies
Short Stories 2015
2015 anthologies
Houghton Mifflin books